Tony Romeo  is an American journalist in Pennsylvania, working for KYW (AM), where he is the Harrisburg bureau chief.

Career 
Romeo attended Penn State Harrisburg. While a college student, he covered the Three Mile Island accident for WSBA (AM) in York, Pennsylvania.

He later worked as a television reporter in Harrisburg, Pennsylvania and as news director for radio stations in White Plains, New York.

In 1987, Romeo was reporting the press conference where Pennsylvania Treasurer Budd Dwyer committed suicide, causing him to develop depression and to retire from news reporting for a period. Of witnessing the suicide, he later revealed that it "was the emotional equivalent of physical shock. You just go on automatic pilot--you have a job to do", but that he felt the effects a week later when "I was a snowball down a hill of bad thoughts." He related that "for years after when someone would hold a press conference and not be clear about what it was about, I would get a hinky feeling."

Romeo was hired by KYW (AM) in 1990 and was assigned to the post of Harrisburg bureau chief in 1993. In 1994, he was assigned to be the Philadelphia City Hall bureau chief.

In 1995, in reference to the disambiguation of his name, Romeo wrote an obituary for the namesake, American songwriter Tony Romeo in the Philadelphia City Paper.

When Philadelphia Mayor Ed Rendell was elected in the 2002 Pennsylvania gubernatorial election, Romeo transferred back to Harrisburg for his second stint as bureau chief. He also contributes content to KDKA Radio in Pittsburgh and KYW TV in Philadelphia. He is a member of the Pennsylvania Legislative Correspondents' Association (Pennsylvania Capitol Reporters).

Awards 
In 2005, Romeo was named one of "Pennsylvania's Most Influential Reporters" by the Pennsylvania political news website PoliticsPA. In 2010, along with Paul Kurtz and John McDevitt, he was the recipient of the Philadelphia Press Association's Radio Enterprise Award.

References 

Living people
People from Harrisburg, Pennsylvania
Pennsylvania political journalists
American radio reporters and correspondents
Year of birth missing (living people)
American male journalists
Pennsylvania State University alumni
American people of Italian descent